The Northerly Stakes is a Perth Racing Group 3 Thoroughbred handicap horse race  for horses aged four years old and upwards, over a distance of 1400 metres at Ascot Racecourse, Perth, Western Australia in October. Prize money is A$150,000.

History
The race was renamed in 2010 after the champion Western Australian thoroughbred Northerly, winner of two W S Cox Plates (2001 & 2002), two Australian Cups (2001 & 2003) and a Caulfield Cup (2002). The race is run on Caulfield Cup day.

Name
1978–2005 - Anniversary Cup
2005–2021 - Northerly Stakes
2022 - Eurythmic Stakes

Grade
 Prior to 2013 - Listed Race 
 2013 - Group 3

Distance
1978 – 2200 metres
1979–1983 – 2400 metres
1984–1999 – 1800 metres
2000 – 1600 metres
2001–2014 – 1400 metres
2015 – 1420 metres

Venue
 2003 - Northam Racecourse
 2005 - Belmont Park Racecourse

Winners

 2022 - Resortman
 2021 - Dance Music
 2020 - Taxagano
 2019 - The Velvet King
 2018 - Man Booker
 2017 - Silverstream
 2016 - Lite'n In My Veins
 2015 - †Black Heart Bart
 2014 - Fuchsia Bandana
 2013 - Playing God
 2012 - King Saul
 2011 - Ranger
 2010 - Famous Roman
 2009 - Megatic
 2008 - Megatic
 2007 - New Spice
 2006 - Grasspatch Girl
 2005 - Changing Lanes
 2004 - Prince Of Vasac
 2003 - Superior Star
 2002 - Mr. Callahan
 2001 - Storm Shot
 2000 - Umah
 1999 - Dynaliebe
 1998 - Paddy Me Lad
 1997 - Summer Beau
 1996 - Classy Dresser
 1995 - Vagabond Boy
 1994 - Zamaloid
 1993 - King Diamond
1992 - Red Javelin 
1991 - Vale Of Avoca 
1990 - Proud Treaty
1989 - Pagonic 
1988 - Eastern Flight
1987 - Leica Soldier 
1986 - Track Jester
1985 - Restoration 
1984 - Mr. Efficient 
1983 - Rosamoss
1982 - Mnitorma
1981 - Little Imagele
1980 - Gay Affair
1979 - Regimental Honour 
1978 - Meliador

† Originally the race was scheduled on 18 October 2015 but the race meeting was abandoned after the fourth race due to track safety. Race was held 21 October 2015.

See also

 List of Australian Group races
 Group races

References

Horse races in Australia
Sport in Perth, Western Australia